The Avellaneda derby is the second-most important rivalry in Argentine football. It is contested between Independiente and Racing Club.

It is the second-most important local derby, behind the Superclásico contested between Boca Juniors and River Plate, which are both based in the city of Buenos Aires. The Avellaneda derby is a major football rivalry. Both teams are very popular in Argentina, and are two of the "five big teams of Argentinian football."

History 
Both clubs were founded in the early years of the 20th century, Racing on 25 March 1903 and Independiente on 1 January 1905. Independente were founded in Buenos Aires and moved to Avellaneda in 1907.

 The first encounter between Independiente and Racing (reserve teams) was on 9 June 1907, with Independiente winning 3–2 when both clubs were competing in lower divisions. Independiente wore a white with blue pocket shirt while Racing wore a squared pink and light blue shirt (both were their first official colours). Independiente and Racing senior squads played against for the first time in Segunda División in 1910. The match was won by Independiente 1–0.
 The first Primera División match was played on 12 December 1915 at Crucecita Stadium (Independiente's venue) where the local team won 2–1, but the result was overturned and Racing were awarded the victory. The two points from that game were enough for Racing to go on to win the 1915 championship.
 Racing Club dominated Argentine football during the 1910s, winning more titles than any other surviving team during those years; between 1913 and 1921 Racing won 20 titles to Independiente's 3 in the same period of time.
 Racing Club's dominance extended into the 1950s where they became the first team (in the professional era) to win three consecutive championships (1949, 1950 and 1951).
 In 1964, Independiente became the first Argentine team to win the Copa Libertadores.
 In 1967, Racing Club became the first Argentine club to win the Copa Intercontinental; this achievement marked the end of Racing Club's supremacy.
 Between 1972 and 1975, Independiente won an unprecedented four consecutive Copa Libertadores titles.
 In 1984, Independiente won their seventh Copa Libertadores, earning them the nickname "King of Cups."
 In 2001, Racing Club won the Apertura, their first league title in 35 years.
 The most recent local title earned by either of the two clubs was the 2018-19 Argentine Primera División, won by Racing Club.
 In 2017, Independiente won their second Copa Sudamericana, the last international title earned by either team.
 In 2019, Racing achieves its second local league in 5 years and the "champions trophy", a national cup.

Violence
The November 26, 1961, saw the most violent game between the two clubs, the referee was forced to suspend the game for 6 minutes due to fighting amongst the players. The referee eventually sent off 4 players from each team. The game ended in a 1–1 draw.

On August 13, 2006, the Avellaneda derby was abandoned after violence between the fans escalated out of control. Independiente were winning 2–0 in Libertadores de America when rioting started in the away stands. The Racing fans then started to attack the police, the game was eventually abandoned by referee Horacio Elizondo. The three points from the game were eventually awarded to Independiente.

Stadiums

The two stadiums are only a few hundred metres apart. Independiente play at the Estadio Libertadores de América, commonly known as Libertadores de América; it was originally opened on 4 March 1928. Racing Club play at the Estadio Presidente Perón, commonly known as El Cilindro; it was opened on 3 September 1950.

Statistics

Head-to-head
Matches record as of July 10, 2022:

Primera División matches 
Complete list of games played in Primera División since the first derby of 1915:

Notes

Head-to-head statistics in Primera División

National cups matches 
Complete list of games played in national cups:

Head-to-head statistics in National cups

International cups matches 
Complete list of games played in national cups:

Head-to-head statistics in international cups

Titles by club

Independiente highlights
 On November 3, 1940, Independiente beat Racing 7–0, the biggest winning margin in the history of the derby.
 On August 20, 1961, Independiente secured a 4–0 home win, but it was not enough to stop Racing club from eventually winning the championship.
 On December 17, 1967, on the last day of the Nacional Independiente beat the visiting Racing Club team 4–0 with 2 goals from Luis Artime to win the championship.
 The last round of fixtures during the Metropolitano 1970 saw River Plate beat Unión de Santa Fe 6–0 to give them a chance of stealing the championship for Independiente. On July 27 Independiente travelled to El Cilindro eventually winning the game 3–2 to give them the championship by the narrowest of margins, they finished level on points with River, both teams with a +18 goal difference, Independiente had scored 43 goals to River's 42.
 On March 24, 1974, Independiente beat Racing 4–1 with a hat-trick from Ricardo Bochini, the only one he scored in 714 games for the club.
 On May 19, 1974, during the Metropolitano 1974 Independiente won 5–1 at El Cilindro. They repeated the 5–1 away win less than one year later on March 2, 1975, in the Metropolitano 1975.
 On December 22, 1983, in the last game of the Metropolitano Independiente knew that a win would see them crowned champions what's more the visiting Racing team had already been relegated from the Primera for the first time in the professional era of Argentine football. Independiente won 2–0 with goals from Ricardo Giusti and Enzo Trossero to win the championship.
 In the 1994 Opening Tournament, Independiente wins the derby after 11 years of not being able to achieve it.
 In the 1997 Opening Tournament, Independiente wins the "double visor" derby after 14 years of not being able to achieve it.
 On August 19, 2002, Independiente won 4–1 at River Plate Stadium on their way to winning the Apertura 2002 championship.
 On September 11, 2005, Independiente won 4–0 at the Doble Visera, with a hat-trick from Nicolás Frutos and the best goal of Sergio Agüero.
 On November 25, 2017, Independiente, with reserve players, won 1-0 at "El Cilindro".

Racing highlights
On May 31, 1931, the teams were due to meet for the first round of fixtures of the professional era of Argentine football. Racing asked to postpone the game and Independiente accepted. This meant that the first game between the two took place on September 27 at Racing Club's ground the eventual score was 7–4 to Racing, it still stands as the highest scoring game between the two.
 On September 15, 1963, Racing secured a 4–0 away win, but Independiente recovered to win the championship virtually mirroring the events of 1961.
 On November 20, 1966, Racing Club were crowned as champions, one week later they played Independiente, and the game finished 3–3.
 On September 21, 1975, during the Nacional Racing won 5–4 in el Cilindro with Alberto Jorge scoring 4 goals, three from the penalty spot. Jorge is the only player to score 4 in the Avellaneda derby and this was the last time that Racing were given 3 penalties in a game.
 In 1992 Racing Club and Independiente met in the Supercopa Sudamericana, Racing Club won their home leg 2–1 and on October 8, 1992, held Independiente to a 0–0 draw to win on aggregate. It is the only time the two have met in international competition.
 On August 26, 2001, in the 2nd round of fixtures Racing Club's Gabriel Loeschbor scored in the last minute of the game to earn a 1–1 draw. At the end of the Apertura 2001 Racing won the championship by one point.
In 2015 they met in the "Liguilla Pre-Libertadores", Racing won 2–0 the first leg in the Independiente's stadium, Independiente won 2–1 in the Racing's stadium, but Racing qualified to the Copa Libertadores by an aggregate score of 3–2.
On February 23, 2019, the Derby was played at the Estadio Libertadores de América, Racing came as the leader of the championship and Independiente had hopes of damaging Racing chances of winning the tournament. Racing defeated Independiente 3–1 and got a very important victory that would allow them to remain as leader and eventually get their 18th championship on March 31, 2019, after drawing against Tigre.
 On February 9, 2020, Racing obtained a remarkable 1–0 victory while playing with 9 men for the whole second half.

Players for both clubs
This is a non-exhaustive list of players to have played for both clubs.

 Roque Avallay
 Agustín Balbuena
 Gabriel Calderón
 Néstor Clausen
 Luis Alberto Carranza
 Emmanuel Culio
 Osvaldo Escudero
 Carlos Fren
 Esteban Fuertes
 Claudio Graf
 Miguel Ángel Ludueña
 Osvaldo Miranda
 Hilario Navarro
 José Omar Pastoriza
 Hugo Pérez
 Norberto Raffo
 Marcelo Saralegui
 José Serrizuela

References

Argentine football rivalries
derby
Club Atlético Independiente
Racing Club de Avellaneda